Rudina Pasveer (born in the 1960s) is a Dutch former competitive figure skater. She won the 1981 Dutch national title and competed at five ISU Championships.

Career 
Pasveer began learning to skate with her sister in Groningen, around 1970. She trained at KunstrijClub Groningen. She finished ninth at the 1977 and 1978 World Junior Championships in Megève, France.

Pasveer's first senior national medal, bronze, came at the 1977 Dutch Championships. She took silver at the next three editions and placed 25th at her first senior ISU Championship, the 1980 World Championships in Dortmund, West Germany.

In 1981, Pasveer became the Dutch national senior ladies' champion. She finished 15th at the 1981 European Championships in Innsbruck, Austria, and 25th at the 1981 World Championships in Hartford, Connecticut, United States.

After ending her amateur career, she competed at four consecutive World Professional Championships in Jaca.

Competitive highlights

Amateur career

Professional career

References 

1960s births
Dutch female single skaters
Living people
Sportspeople from Groningen (city)
20th-century Dutch women
21st-century Dutch women